Nicholai, Nikolaj, or Nicholas Pavlovich Teliatnikow (May 15, 1909 – July 3, 1970) was a Russian photographer and photojournalist based in New York City. He was renowned for his portrayal of Russian-American life in New York City, depicting social as well as historical issues such as the White Emigre.

Career
Teliatnikow received much attention for his portrayal of Russian-American life in New York City, particularly his depiction of the White Emigre. He was the main photographer for the Russian Orthodox Church Outside Russia from 1940 to 1960; he photographed Russian-American events such as weddings, christenings, balls, conferences and demonstrations. He also photographed several clergymen of the Eastern Orthodox Church.

Teliatnikow signed his photographs with a white, hand-written watermark, "Photo by N. Teliatnikow". He owned two studios, which he eventually combined in his Hamilton Heights apartment, where he stored over 50,000 photographs (including the negatives).

Sources

External links
 

1909 births
1970 deaths
American photojournalists
Russian photographers
Commercial photographers
American portrait photographers
Photographers from New York (state)
Burials at Novo-Diveevo Russian Cemetery
Russian anti-communists
Russian monarchists
Russian nobility
Russian Orthodox Christians from the United States
White Russian emigrants to the United States
20th-century American photographers